

Main campus

Academic buildings

Administrative buildings

Athletic buildings

Dining Halls

Residence Hall

Health sciences campus buildings

West Research campus buildings

Razed buildings

Ledyard E. Ross Hall
Ledyard E. Ross Hall is a building on the East Carolina University campus at MacGregor Downs Road in Greenville, North Carolina in the United States, adjacent to the ECU Health Sciences Building. The facility was named after Ledyard E. Ross, a class of 1951 ECU graduate and notable Greenville orthodontist. The  building officially opened October 12, 2012, and is home to East Carolina University School of Dental Medicine. Until its opening, the School of Dental Medicine’s students shared their learning space at the Brody Medical Sciences Building. In 2016, East Carolina opened the ECU School of Dental Medicine Research Center on the fourth floor of Ross Hall, adding almost  of laboratory and laboratory support space.

Research and education
While Ross Hall primarily serves as an educational institution, it also aims to provide reduced-fee dental care to low-income patients. The school houses specialty suite for orthodontics, pediatric dentistry, a clinical research area, and arrangements for patients with special needs. In June 2012, Ross Hall opened its first of ten planned community service learning centers with the intentions of reaching rural or under served communities. As of 2016, Ross Hall has opened eight of these centers focused on research on health disparities, with the future goals of broadening its research into the concentrations of biomaterials, bioengineering, and the oral impacts of chronic diseases like diabetes and obesity.

Technology
East Carolina University’s School of Dental Medicine at Ross Hall was named an Apple Distinguished Program by Apple Inc. for its implementation of advanced technologies for student education and teledentistry. Ross Hall possesses 133 operatories, or "smart classroom" learning halls, seminar rooms, faculty offices, and a simulation suite, in which attending dental students can gain hands-on practice in dentistry.

Under construction buildings

References 

East Carolina University
East Carolina University buildings
East Carolina University